Laroche-Migennes station is a railway station serving the towns Migennes and Laroche-Saint-Cydroine, Yonne department, central France. It lies at the junction of the Paris–Marseille railway with the Laroche-Migennes–Cosne railway. The station is served by regional trains towards Dijon, Paris, Auxerre, Corbigny and Avallon.

References

External links
 

Railway stations in Bourgogne-Franche-Comté